The AQM-35 was a supersonic target drone produced by the  Northrop Corporation.

Overview

The AQM-35 program began life in 1953 as the Model RP-61 supersonic target drone. In June 1954 the United States Air Force awarded Northrop a contract for development of the project as the Q-4; the first flight-capable XQ-4 was launched in 1956.

The XQ-4 was capable of either ground or air launch, though the former mode was never tested. It was powered by a Westinghouse XJ81-WE-3 turbojet, allowing it to reach speeds of Mach 1.55. The drone's course was followed with radar, and flight commands were sent by a radio telemetry system. When the mission was completed the XQ-4 would deploy a three-stage parachute system along with four large inflatable airbags to cushion the impact with the ground.

The Air Force planned to use the Q-4 as a target for various surface-to-air and air-to-air missiles. A secondary reconnaissance function was planned, with TV or cameras carried. The drone was air-launched by a Lockheed DC-130 Hercules drone controller aircraft, or other carrier aircraft.

In 1963, the Q-4 family of drones were given the designation AQM-35A and AQM-35B. They were never considered entirely successful, with a variety of problems arising during both the development and flight testing phases. It was also considered that the flight performance of the drone was so high that it was not a realistic test for the missiles being developed––ironic since the whole point of the project was to develop a supersonic target. Only 25 of all types were ever built. The last examples of the type were retired during the 1960s.

Variants

XQ-4Prototype of the RP-61 supersonic target drone.
Q-4Production target drones.
Q-4ADeveloped to use a Fairchild J83 engine and a modified radar signature for testing the CIM-10 Bomarc missile. When the engine could not be developed in time the variant was cancelled.
Q-4B Fitted with a much more powerful J85-GE-5 engine and a strengthened airframe. This variant was first flown in 1961.
AQM-35APost 1962 designation of the Q-4 drone.
AQM-35BPost 1962 designation of the Q-4B

Specifications (Q-4/AQM-35A)

See also

References

 Northrop (Radioplane) Q-4/AQM-35

Q-004
1950s United States special-purpose aircraft
Target drones of the United States
Single-engined jet aircraft
High-wing aircraft